Sylvie Goy-Chavent, born Sylvie Chavant (born 23 May 1963 in Dunkirk) is a French politician and a member of the Senate of France. She represents the Ain department and is a member of the Radical Party. From 1995 to 2017 she was also the Mayor of Cerdon, Ain.

She was reelected in the 2020 French Senate election.

Ahead of the 2022 presidential elections, Goy-Chavent publicly declared her support for Michel Barnier as the Republicans’ candidate.

References

Page on the Senate website

1963 births
Living people
People from Dunkirk
Politicians from Hauts-de-France
Union for a Popular Movement politicians
Radical Party (France) politicians
French Senators of the Fifth Republic
Senators of Ain
Mayors of places in Auvergne-Rhône-Alpes
Women mayors of places in France
Women members of the Senate (France)
21st-century French women politicians
Union of Democrats and Independents politicians
Regional councillors of Auvergne-Rhône-Alpes